Mettuguda Metro Station is located on the Blue Line of the Hyderabad Metro. It is part of Corridor III of the Hyderabad Metro starting from Nagole and towards Hi-Tech city and was opened to the public on 28 November 2017.

History 
Nagole-Mettuguda stretch was initially proposed to open in March 2015 but was later put off. The station received the safety certification from the Commissioner for Metro Rail Safety (CMRS) in 2016.

The station

Structure
Metuguda elevated metro station situated on the Blue Line of Hyderabad Metro.

Station layout
Street Level This is the first level where passengers may park their vehicles and view the local area map.

Concourse level Ticketing office or Ticket Vending Machines (TVMs) is located here. Retail outlets and other facilities like washrooms, ATMs, first aid, etc., will be available in this area.

Platform level  This layer consists of two platforms. Trains takes passengers from this level.

References

Hyderabad Metro stations
2017 establishments in Telangana
Railway stations in India opened in 2017